Competitor for  Canada
 

Almighty Voice, also known as Jacob Jamieson or Jimerson (February 19, 1873 - August 15, 1960), was a Canadian lacrosse player who competed in the 1904 Summer Olympics. In 1904 he was member of the Mohawk Indians Lacrosse Team which won the bronze medal in the lacrosse tournament.

References

1873 births
1960 deaths
Canadian lacrosse players
Lacrosse players at the 1904 Summer Olympics
Olympic lacrosse players of Canada
First Nations sportspeople
Canadian Mohawk people
Olympic bronze medalists for Canada